Suman Chakraborty (born 15 February 1990) is an Indian sports journalist, football commentator, TV presenter, football analyst and writer in English and Bangla. He has commentated on around 1000 official football matches.

Personal life 
Suman Chakraborty was born on 15 February 1990, in a Bengali family in Kolkata, West Bengal.

Career 
Chakraborty started working as a journalist in the Indian Super League in 2014. Then he worked as a football commentator at Ten Sports, Sony Six, Jalsha Movies and ESPN STAR Sports. He joined the Kolkata-based sports media house Xtra Time and worked as a sports journalist and football analyst there. He first commented in a Federation Cup match between Salgaocar FC and Bengaluru FC, at the Tilak Maidan in 2014, along with Novy Kapadia. He commentated in the Calcutta Football League, Federation Cup, Durand Cup. He also became the youngest to commentate in a FIFA World Cup qualifier match, in Sony Six. He also worked as the media manager in an Indian football club, Punjab FC. Currently, he is working at 1Sports as a commentator in I-League.

See also 
 Football in India

References 

1990 births
Living people
English association football commentators
Sports journalism